Głos wolny wolność ubezpieczający (variously translated as A Free Voice Ensuring Freedom or The Free Voice Guaranteeing Freedom) is a Polish political treatise. It was written some time between 1733 and 1743, and published in 1743 in Nancy by former king of Poland Stanisław Leszczyński. While Leszczyński himself claimed authorship, some modern scientists believe it was rather ghost written by someone of his retinue, possibly Mateusz Białłozor. One of the most important political works of Enlightenment in Poland, it is possible that the French translation of the work, La Voie Libre, influenced Jean Jacques Rousseau.

Heavily influenced by Stanisław Dunin-Karwicki's Egzorbitancje and De ordinanda Republica, the treatise called for deep reform of Poland's political system, economy and a social reform. Free Voice's author proposed that Polish-Lithuanian Commonwealth's royal election laws be changed to allow only local candidates for the throne ("Piast kings") and that the landed gentry abandon their faith in divine providence as the only force able to deliver the fatherland from all dangers. It further called for reclamation of all Crown land to repair the royal treasury, limiting the liberum veto laws, eliminating landless gentry from participating in the Sejm and Sejmiks, and that the szlachta be covered by a 10% income tax as until the late 18th century the gentry was virtually exempted from all taxes.

As to military reforms, the author proposed that the Pospolite ruszenie system be abolished and replaced with a standing army of 100,000 men at arms. Finally, the treatise was one of the first political pamphlets to propose abolition of serfdom in Poland, granting the serfs with civil ("personal") rights and replacing serfdom with rent.

References

Citations

Bibliography 

  
  

Polish non-fiction books
1743 in the Polish–Lithuanian Commonwealth
1743 books